Goshayesh (also Romanized as Goshāyesh; also known as Gushegesh, Gyushegesh, Koshāyesh, and Qūshāqesh) is a village in Ozomdel-e Shomali Rural District, in the Central District of Varzaqan County, East Azerbaijan Province, Iran. At the 2006 census, its population was 100, in 20 families.

References 

Towns and villages in Varzaqan County